Schůzka o půl čtvrté is a 1957 Czechoslovak film. The film starred Josef Kemr.

References

External links
 

1957 films
Czechoslovak romantic drama films
1950s Czech-language films
Czech romantic drama films
1950s Czech films